Early parliamentary elections were held in Andorra on 3 April 2011 after the General Council of Andorra was dissolved over problems in passing important laws, including the budget and laws related to a value added tax.

The Democrats for Andorra won an absolute majority of seats making Antoni Martí the prime minister-designate.

Background
The two co-princes of Andorra – the President of France and the Bishop of Urgell – do not get involved in internal politics, particularly after the May 1993 constitution making the principality an independent state.

Fall of government
A crisis in government developed after banking secrecy laws were lifted and a value added tax was due to be applied to companies, along with an opening up to foreign investment. After the 2009 election, the Social Democratic Party achieved a plurality of seats but fell one seat short of an overall majority, thus providing for more deadlock during key pieces of legislation. The government fell two years before its full four-year term was due to end after failing to pass the budget with an absolute majority. Jaume Bartumeu effectively called for an election by requesting that the country's co-princes dissolve parliament.

Electoral system
Twenty-eight "general councillors" were elected, based on closed party lists:
fourteen general councillors representing the seven parishes (two councillors per parish), elected from the list with most votes in each parish;
fourteen general councillors elected from national lists using the largest remainder method of proportional representation.
The parish lists and the national list are independent of one another: the same person cannot appear on both the national list and on a parish list, and voters cast two separate ballots. There is no requirement to vote for the same party for both lists.

Campaign
Five parties contested the election: The governing Social Democrats (PS), the newly formed opposition Democrats for Andorra (DA), the third place Andorra for Change (ApC), the Greens and the local conservative Lauredian Union (LU) party.

Out of these only the PS, DA and LU contested the parish seats. The PS contested all parishes, while DA contested all but Sant Julià de Lòria, which was contested by Lauredian Union. ApC announced they would support DA candidates on a parish level.

Incumbent Prime Minister Jaume Bartumeu and his main challenger Antoni Martí wanted to change the protectionism previously prevalent in the national economy. They sought to attract foreign capital primarily in the technology sector to diversify from a current economy based on trade (33%), tourism (33%) and banking (17%). Due to the global financial crisis and its effect on Spain, which accounts for 80% of Andorran trade, (the other 20% with France) the economy was in a "severe crisis." Since 2008, 4,000 people in the country of 84,525 have lost their jobs, including seasonal employment.

Bartumeu had released the listing of Andorra's tax haven status with the Organisation for Economic Co-operation and Development. He also enacted a law to lift bank secrecy. He accuses right-winged parties of not forgiving him for a "move towards transparency and fiscal reforms."

Martí said that: "We develop our tax system to be within the European standards, Andorrans do not want to pay taxes, but they understand the need to change the system. We will keep an attractive tax regime and will continue to offer attractive products." Still there was some "broad consensus on economic and tax issues" between the two main parties; though the main difference was the creation of an income tax. Bartumeu sought to tax incomes of more than 40,000 euros, even though the minimum wage is 39,600. Marti opposed the entire proposal.

Eusebi Nomen of Andorra for Change also denounced the proposed increased tax burden and accused the government of selling "national sovereignty."

The Greens of Andorra's Isabel Lozano said that economic development must be more environmentally friendly.

Results
The Democrats for Andorra won a landslide victory, taking every parish in which they stood and winning the national vote, giving them 20 out of the 28 General Council's seats, the biggest victory in the country's history. The Social Democrats lost all their parish seats and held only their six national seats, while Lauredian Union returned to the General Council, winning the parish of Sant Julià de Lòria. Andorra for Change lost all their seats, and the Greens finished last, gaining no seats.

Voter turnout was 74.14%. Of the 28 members elected, 14 were women, making 50% of the parliament legislators women (up from 32%).  This made Andorra the first European country to reach gender parity in parliament.

Parish lists
Canillo

Encamp

Ordino

La Massana

Andorra la Vella

Sant Julià de Lòria

Escaldes-Engordany

References

External links
Election Guide - Andorra

Parliamentary elections in Andorra
Andorra
General Council (Andorra)
2011 in Andorra
April 2011 events in Europe